1985 JSL Cup Final was the tenth final of the JSL Cup competition. The final was played at Toyohashi Football Stadium in Aichi on July 7, 1985. Yomiuri won the championship.

Overview
Yomiuri won their 2nd title, by defeating Nissan Motors 2–0.

Match details

See also
1985 JSL Cup

References

JSL Cup
1985 in Japanese football
Tokyo Verdy matches
Yokohama F. Marinos matches